The first season of De Férias com o Ex, a Brazilian television programme, began airing on 13 October 2016 on MTV. The series concluded on 15 December 2016 after 10 episodes. The show was announced in July 2016.

Gabi Prado later returned to the beach during the second series, this time as main cast.

Cast 
The official list of cast members was released on 5 September 2016 and includes five single boys:  Alex Merencio, André Coelho, Guilherme Araújo, Héric Henrique and Iure Meirelles; as well as five single girls; Anna Clara Maia, Gabrieli Diniz, Michelle Alveia, Nathalia Andrade and Raphaela Sirena.

The official cast members all arrived in the first episode of the series, but would be joined by their exes one-by-one over the series.

Bold indicates original cast member; all other cast were brought into the series as an ex.

Duration of cast 

 Key:  = "Cast member" is featured in this episode
 Key:  = "Cast member" arrives on the beach
 Key:  = "Cast member" has an ex arrive on the beach
 Key:  = "Cast member" arrives on the beach and has an ex arrive during the same episode
 Key:  = "Cast member" does not feature in this episode

Future Appearances

After this season, Gabrielle Prado, returned the following season, and in 2018, appeared in A Fazenda 10, she finished in 11th place in the competition.

After this season, in 2019, Anna Clara Maia and André Coelho appeared in Power Couple Brasil 4, they finished in 3rd place.

After this season, in 2019, Guilherme Araújo, returned in De Férias com o Ex Brasil: Celebs as original cast member.

After this season, in 2021, Guilherme Araújo appeared in A Fazenda 13, he finished in 11th place in the competition.

Episodes

References

External links
Official website 

De Férias com o Ex seasons
2016 Brazilian television seasons
Ex on the Beach